was a popular didactic Buddhist-inspired parlour game during the Edo period in Japan.

Play
The game was played as night fell upon the region using three separate rooms. In preparation, participants would light 100 andon in the third room and position a single mirror on the surface of a small table. When the sky was at its darkest, guests gathered in the first of the three rooms, taking turns orating tales of ghoulish encounters and reciting folkloric tales passed on by villagers who claimed to have experienced supernatural encounters. These tales soon became known as kaidan.  Upon the end of each kaidan, the story-teller would enter the third room and extinguish one andon, look in the mirror and make their way back to the first room. With each passing tale, the room slowly grew darker and darker as the participants reached the one hundredth tale, creating a safe haven for the evocation of spirits.

However, as the game reached the ninety-ninth tale, many participants would stop, fearful of invoking the spirits they had been summoning.

History

While the exact origins of Hyakumonogatari Kaidankai are unknown, it was believed that it was first played amongst the samurai class as a test of courage. In Ogita Ansei's 1660 nursery tale "Otogi Monogatari" a version of the game was described in which the narrative tells of several young samurai telling tales in the Hyakumonogatari Kaidankai fashion. In the tale, as one samurai finished the one hundredth tale, he began to extinguish the candle when suddenly he sees a giant gnarled hand descend upon him from above. While some of the samurai cowered in fear, a swipe of his sword revealed the hand to be merely the shadow of a spider.

At first, the game of Hyakumonogatari Kaidankai was popular amongst the aristocratic warrior class, but it soon garnered favorable reputation amongst the working class peasants and town people. With a heightened interest in telling newer and original kaidan, people began scouring the countryside for tales of the mysterious, many of which combined a mixture of ghostly vengeance and elements of karma in Buddhism.

A true popular phenomenon, the hype of Hyakumonogatari Kaidankai combined with new printing technology created a boom in the publication of kaidan-themed books collecting appropriate tales from every corner of Japan and China.  But it was in 1677 that the first kaidan-shu was published. Known as Shokoku Hyakumonogatari, or 100 Tales of Many Countries, the book earned popularity for having been a compilation of tales from people residing in several countries, and who further claimed each tale was true.

Books in this genre often used the term Hyakumonogatari in the title, and the published tale’s popularity continued long after the fad for the game had faded.

In other media

The game of Hyakumonogatari Kaidankai became a cult phenomenon in Japan, and while the hype of these tales has receded, many J-horror films and Japanese urban legends can be attributed to the parlour game's influence. 

Woodblock painter and founder of the Maruyama-Shijo School of Painting, Maruyama Okyo is considered the first artist to offer paintings of the yurei who were frequently cast in kaidan.

The telling of the tales in a hyakumonogatari Kaidankai formed the basis of the film, Yokai Monsters: One Hundred Monsters released in 1968. 

In 2002, Fuji TV released the television program "Kaidan Hyakumonogatari" using the basis of the game Hyakumonogatari Kaidankai to tell classic Japanese ghost stories. The series starred Naoto Takenaka and showcased 11 episodes, including an episode which focused on the tale of Yuki Onna.

The popularity of Hyakumonogatari Kaidankai is not limited to Japan, in the Episode "Freshman Fear" of the A&E docu-drama reality television series Paranormal State, members of Penn State Paranormal Research Society play the Ancient Japanese Game of One Hundred Candles during their investigation of a supposed haunting in a student dormitory.

Other cultural influences include:
 In the tenth episode of the anime xxxHolic Yūko invites Watanuki, Doumeki and Himawari to the Hyakumonogatari Kaidankai.
 In Season 2, Ep. 13 of the anime School Rumble, the students of 2-C can be seen playing the game throughout the episode.
 An adaptation opens the anime series Ghost Hunt.
 In the manga Sundome the members of the Roman Club play Hyakumonogatari Kaidankai in one scene.
 In the spin-off manga "Girls und Panzer: Motto Love Love Sakusen Desu!", the girls in the Senshado club organize a Hyakumonogatari night (with the Edo Period history buff making full use of the rakugo conventions). The game is seen in a more comical tone, with the various team recounting mysterious events like everything was either completely normal or of no importance.
 One of the Conversation Skills in Persona 2: Eternal Punishment is the '100 Stories', with a special reward for when players manage to display all 100 scripted stories.
 Hyakumonogatari Kaidan can be read in Persona 4 to increase Courage
 A 1968 film starring Miwa Takada
 In the fifth episode of the anime Sengoku Otome: Momoiro Paradox, the main characters are forced to participate in this by a group of undead samurai warriors.
 In the book Night Film by Marisha Pessl.
 In Kaidan Restaurant anime  where each episode is broken up into three "dishes" (Appetizer, Main Dish, and Dessert), the "Dessert" is a ghost story told by one of the main characters while playing Hyakumonogatari Kaidankai.
 In the 3rd novel of The Zashiki Warashi of Intellectual Village Series
 In MMORPG The Secret World, friendly ultraterrestrials explain in communications left around Tokyo's Oni-and-Elder-God-besieged Kaidan neighborhood that <<Hyakumonogatari Kaidankai>> was a name originally referring to themselves before it was given to the game, which they had in fact created in order to gently educate humanity about the dangers facing it in such places.
 In Anthony Bourdain’s comic series Hungry Ghosts, the game is used as a framing device to tell several horror stories derived from popular folklore.
 In the Legend of the Five Rings Roleplaying Game tabletop RPG, the Hyakumonogatari Kaidankai features prominently in the sourcebook Book of Void, both as a game played by characters in the setting and as a particular book called Hyakumonogatari Kaidenkai.
 In the anime Yamishibai, the season finale has a group of characters playing the game and reciting all the past episodes throughout the series.

See also
 Hyakunin Isshu
 Karuta
 Kimodameshi

References

Addiss, Steven, Japanese Ghosts and Demons, USA, George Braziller, Inc., 1986,

External links
Tales of Ghostly Japan Japanzine By Zack Davisson
A Brief History of Kaidan
Asian Folklore Studies: The Appeal of Kaidan Tales of the Strange. 
The Ghosts of Japan
Information on The Kaidan Suite, a musical interpretation of hyaku monogatari by the Kitsune Ensemble.
Hyakumonogatari.com

Buddhist folklore
Japanese games
Japanese mythology
Japanese folklore
Japanese horror fiction